Law Abiding Citizen is a 2009 American vigilante action thriller film directed by F. Gary Gray, written by Kurt Wimmer, and starring Jamie Foxx and Gerard Butler (who also co-produced). The film takes place in Philadelphia, telling the story of a man driven to seek justice while targeting not only his family's killer but also those who have supported a corrupt criminal justice system, intending to assassinate anyone supporting the system. Law Abiding Citizen was filmed on location in Philadelphia, and released theatrically by Overture Films in North America on October 16, 2009.

The film grossed $127 million worldwide and received generally negative reviews from critics. Despite this, it was nominated for a Saturn Award as the Best Action/Adventure/Thriller Film of the year, as well as NAACP Image Award nominations for both Foxx (Outstanding Actor in a Motion Picture) and Gray (Outstanding Directing in a Motion Picture).

Plot
In a Philadelphia home invasion, Clarence Darby murders the wife and daughter of engineer Clyde Shelton, who is forced to watch. Prosecuting attorney Nick Rice is unable to securely convict Darby due to mishandled evidence. Unwilling to risk lowering his high conviction rate, he makes a deal with Darby; in exchange for testifying against his accomplice, Rupert Ames (who only intended to steal from Clyde and flee), Darby will plead guilty to third degree murder and receive a lighter sentence. Ames is convicted and sentenced to death, while Darby is released after a few years. Clyde feels betrayed by Nick and the justice system.

Ten years later, Ames is executed via lethal injection, but he dies in agonizing pain due to a chemical alteration; evidence implicates Darby, who is alerted by an anonymous caller. The caller, using an electronically distorted voice and knowledge of cocaine and a possibly underaged woman in his apartment, warns Darby that he's looking at life in prison. Darby hijacks a police car, forcing a lone officer to drive to a deserted warehouse. The officer reveals that he is Clyde, and was also the caller. His gun paralyzes Darby with tetrodotoxin-coated spikes; Clyde straps Darby to a table, makes medical preparations to prolong Darby's suffering, and then video-records himself slowly dismembering Darby before eventually decapitating him. When Darby's remains are found, evidence ties his death to Clyde; Clyde willingly surrenders and goes to prison.

In prison, Clyde demands a new mattress in his cell in exchange for a "confession." Nick initially refuses, but after learning that Clyde traumatized Nick's family with the video of Darby's murder, District Attorney Jonas Cantrell orders Nick to make the deal. In court, Clyde represents himself and successfully argues he should be granted bail, but is jailed for contempt of court after berating the judge for accepting the legal precedent he cited, believing her too easily convinced and eager to let madmen and murderers back on the street.

After giving Nick his confession, Clyde demands an elaborate steak lunch and a music player be delivered to his cell by a specific time, in exchange for the location of Darby's lawyer, who was reported missing. Nick agrees, though the lunch is delayed a few minutes by the warden's security measures. Once he has his meal, Clyde provides the location of the lawyer. Nick is too late to save Darby's lawyer as he was suffocated by time-mechanized materials while Clyde's lunch was delayed. After sharing his meal with a cellmate, Clyde proceeds to kill him with his steak bone, forcing the warden to secure him in solitary confinement.

Cantrell and Nick meet the former's CIA contact, learning Clyde previously worked with the agency, creating imaginative assassination devices and orchestrating intricate lethal tactics against nearly impossible targets. They are warned Clyde can kill anyone anytime he wishes and that if he is in jail, it is all part of a bigger plan. During a meeting with Nick and Cantrell, the judge is killed by an explosive hidden in her cell phone. Clyde explains to Nick that the murders are not about revenge, but the failures of the justice system. He then demands to be released and all charges against him dropped or he will "kill everyone".

Nick takes precautionary measures instead. After Clyde's deadline passes, a number of Nick's assistants die from car bombs. Nick meets with Clyde in private, beats him, and yells at him in frustration that, if they had tried to convict Ames and Darby, they might have gone free. Clyde counters that Nick did not care and that if he had at least tried but failed, Clyde would have accepted it. Nick demands an end to the killings, but Clyde tells him that he is just beginning to destroy the corrupt system and all who believe in it. While leaving the funeral of a colleague, Cantrell is killed by a weaponized bomb disposal robot. Nick is ready for his resignation; however, the irate mayor puts the city on lockdown and promotes Nick to acting District Attorney.

Nick learns that Clyde owns an auto garage near the prison. A tunnel leads to a cache of guns, disguises, and other equipment below the solitary confinement cells, with secret entrances to each cell. He realizes that Clyde wanted to be in solitary confinement all along; this allowed him to easily leave the prison without detection and carry out his premeditated murders while misleading the police, who assumed his murders to be accomplices' doing. Evidence points to Clyde's next target, City Hall, where the mayor is holding an emergency meeting. Nick and his men cannot find Clyde, but discover a cell-phone-activated suitcase bomb planted in the room directly below the meeting.

Clyde returns to his cell and is surprised to find Nick waiting for him. Clyde suggests another deal, but Nick, having finally come to understand him, says he no longer makes deals with murderers. Nick tries to reason with Clyde, but Clyde activates the suitcase bomb, causing Nick to leave while locking Clyde's cell behind him. Hearing the ringtone of the detonator, Clyde discovers the bomb underneath his bed and realizes too late that Nick had moved the bomb to his cell. Clyde briefly smiles and returns to his bed. He pulls out and looks at his daughter's bracelet as the bomb explodes.

The epilogue shows Nick watching his daughter in a musical stage performance, an event which he previously had difficulty finding time to attend.

Cast
 Jamie Foxx as Nicholas "Nick" Rice
 Gerard Butler as Clyde Shelton
 Viola Davis as Mayor April Henry
 Bruce McGill as Jonas Cantrell
 Leslie Bibb as Sarah Lowell
 Colm Meaney as Detective Dunnigan
 Regina Hall as Kelly Rice
 Michael Kelly as Bray
 Michael Irby as Detective Garza
 Roger Bart as Brian Bringham
 Christian Stolte as Clarence Darby
 Gregory Itzin as Warden Iger
 Emerald-Angel Young as Denise Rice
 Annie Corley as Judge Laura Burch
 Richard Portnow as Bill Reynolds
 Josh Stewart as Rupert Ames

Development
Gerard Butler was initially signed on to play the prosecuting attorney, while Jamie Foxx was the criminal mastermind operating from inside prison, a reversal of their roles in the final version.

Frank Darabont was expected to direct the film, but he left production due to creative differences with the producers.

Production
Filming began in January 17, 2009 and took place in and around Philadelphia. Filming locations included Philadelphia's City Hall, Laurel Hill Cemetery and the now closed Holmesburg Prison. Holmesburg's "Thunderdome command center" is quite evident in the movie.

The film was edited after being threatened with an NC-17 rating for violence, with the full version released unrated on Blu-ray.

Soundtrack

The score to Law Abiding Citizen was composed by Brian Tyler, who recorded his score with a 52-piece ensemble of the Hollywood Studio Symphony at the Sony Scoring Stage with help from Kieron Charlesworth. The film also uses "Eminence Front" by The Who and "Engine No. 9" by Deftones on Clyde's iPod while he is eating his steak in his cell. While Clyde calls Darby to help him 'escape' the police after Ames' execution, "Bloodline" by Slayer is Darby's ringer.
The tune at the end for closing credits is "Sin's A Good Man's Brother" by Grand Funk Railroad.

Release
The film was released theatrically on October 16, 2009 in the United States. The first theatrical trailer was released on August 14, 2009, and was attached to District 9.

The premiere was held on November 15, 2009, at the Cineworld complex in Glasgow, Butler's home town. Many British tabloids labeled the event as the "Homecoming Premiere", in reference to the Homecoming Scotland 2009 celebrations.

Reception

Box office 

Law Abiding Citizen grossed $73.4 million in the United States and Canada, and $54.6 million in other territories, for a worldwide total of $127.9 million.

The film took second place in its opening weekend, with $21 million, behind Where the Wild Things Are. It went on to gross $126.6 million in total worldwide.

Critical response 

Review aggregator website Rotten Tomatoes reported 26% of 159 critics gave the film a positive review, with an average rating of 4.3/10. The site's critical consensus states: "Unnecessarily violent and unflinchingly absurd, Law Abiding Citizen is plagued by subpar acting and a story that defies reason." On Metacritic, the film has a weighted average score of 34 out of 100 based on 26 critics, indicating "generally unfavorable reviews".

In his review for the Chicago Sun Times, Roger Ebert said, "Law Abiding Citizen is the kind of movie you will like more at the time than in retrospect." He then went on to say, "Still, there's something to be said for a movie you like well enough at the time." Ebert rated the film 3 out of 4 stars.

Sequel
In May 2022, it was announced that a standalone sequel is in development. Kurt Wimmer was hired to return in his role as screenwriter, while Gerard Butler will serve as producer alongside Alan Siegel, Lucas Foster, Rob Paris, and Mike Witherill. Foster stated in his returning role as a producer that the studios look forward to "revisit[ing] these great characters" stating that the premise "seems even more relevant today than when...the original film" released. The filmmaker stated: "We’re going to blow your mind… again." While the plot has not been revealed, Paris and Witherill jointly stated that the creatives involved, see the movie as a "franchise opportunit[y]." The project will be a joint-venture production between G-Base Productions, Rivulet Films, Warp Films, and Village Roadshow Pictures.

See also
 Vigilante film
 List of films featuring home invasions

References

External links

 
 
 

2009 films
2000s vigilante films
2009 action drama films
2009 action thriller films
2009 psychological thriller films
2009 crime drama films
2009 crime thriller films
2000s prison films
2000s psychological drama films
American films about revenge
American action drama films
American action thriller films
American crime drama films
American crime thriller films
American vigilante films
American prison films
Fictional portrayals of the Philadelphia Police Department
Films about capital punishment
Films about corruption
Films about murderers
Films directed by F. Gary Gray
Films produced by Lucas Foster
Films scored by Brian Tyler
Films set in 1999
Films set in 2009
Films set in Philadelphia
Films shot in Philadelphia
Films with screenplays by Kurt Wimmer
Home invasions in film
Overture Films films
American rape and revenge films
2000s English-language films
2000s American films
Works about prosecutors